Events in the year 1936 in Bulgaria.

Incumbents 
Monarch – Boris III

Events 

 1 March – Trud, a Bulgarian daily newspaper that is the largest in circulation and one of the oldest, released its first issue.

References 

 
1930s in Bulgaria
Years of the 20th century in Bulgaria
Bulgaria
Bulgaria